"Sun Hits the Sky" is a song by English rock band Supergrass. It was the third single from the band's second album In It for the Money. It was released in June 1997 and reached number 10 in the UK Singles Chart. The B-side, "Some Girls Are Bigger Than Others", is a cover of the Smiths' song.

Track listings

UK and Australian CD single 
 "Sun Hits the Sky"
 "Some Girls Are Bigger Than Others"
 "Sun Hits the Sky" (Radio 1 Evening Session)

UK cassette and limited-edition 7-inch single 
 "Sun Hits the Sky" (radio edit)
 "Some Girls Are Bigger Than Others"

Japanese mini-album 
 "Sun Hits the Sky" (radio edit)
 "Cheapskate"
 "Some Girls Are Bigger Than Others"
 "Sun Hits the Sky" (Radio 1 Evening Session)
 "Odd?" (original version)
 "Melanie Davis"

Credits and personnel
Credits are taken from the In It for the Money album liner notes.

Studio
 Recorded at Sawmills Studio (Golant, UK)

Personnel
 Supergrass – writing, production, mixing
 Rob Coombes – writing
 Satin Singh – percussion
 John Cornfield – production, mixing

Charts

References

1996 songs
1997 singles
EMI Music Japan singles
Parlophone singles
Songs written by Rob Coombes
Supergrass songs